Cedar Creek, located in Lincoln County in south-central Kentucky, USA, is an  tributary to the Dix River. Via the Dix, Kentucky and Ohio rivers, it is part of the Mississippi River watershed.  In 2002, a section of Cedar Creek was impounded to form Cedar Creek Lake.

See also
List of rivers of Kentucky

References

Rivers of Kentucky
Rivers of water of Lincoln County, Kentucky